The Vicariate Apostolic of Mitú is a Latin pre-diocesan jurisdiction of the Catholic Church in Colombia.

It is exempt, i.e. immediately subject to the Holy See (not part of any ecclesiastical province) and depends on the missionary Roman Congregation for the Evangelization of Peoples.

Its cathedral episcopal see is the Catedral María Inmaculada, dedicated to Mary Immaculate, in the city of Mitú, in Vaupés Department.

Statistics 
As per 2014, it pastorally served 15,200 Catholics (38.0% of 40,000 total) on 54,135 km² in 9 parishes and 12 missions with 27 priests (16 diocesan, 11 religious), 1 deacon, 15 lay religious (11 brothers, 4 sisters) and 6 seminarians.

History 
On 9 June 1949 Pope Pius XII established the Apostolic Prefecture of Mitú on territory split off from the Apostolic Vicariate of Los Llanos de San Martín.

It lost split-off territory on 19 January 1989 when the Apostolic Vicariate of San José del Guaviare (now a diocese) was created.

On 19 June 1989 Pope John Paul II elevated it to a Vicariate Apostolic (entitled to a titular bishop) and named it the Apostolic Vicariate of Mitú-Puerto Inírida.
 
It was split in two on 30 November 1996, creating the hence renamed Apostolic Vicariate of Mitú and the split-off Apostolic Vicariate of Inírida.

Ordinaries 
(all Roman Rite; so far members of a Latin missionary congregation)

Apostolic Prefects of Mitú 
 Gerardo Valencia Cano, Yarumal Society for the Foreign Missions (M.X.Y.) † (19 July 1949 – 24 March 1953); later Titular Bishop of Rhesaina (1953.03.24 – 1972.01.21) as Apostolic Vicar of Buenaventura (Colombia) (1953.03.24 – 1972.01.21)
 Heriberto Correa Yepes, M.X.Y. † (11 Nov 1953 – Dec 1966 Resigned); later Titular Bishop of Rhesaina (1973.01.29 – death 2010.09.09) as Apostolic Vicar of Buenaventura (Colombia) (1973.01.29 – 1996.11.30) and on emeritate
 Belarmino Correa Yepes, M.X.Y. † (30 Oct 1967 – 19 Jan 1989); later Titular Bishop of Horrea Cœlia (1989.01.19 – 1999.10.29) as last Apostolic Vicar of San José del Guaviare (Colombia) (1989.01.19 – 1999.10.29), promoted first Bishop of the same Buenaventura (1999.10.29 – retired 2006.01.17)

Apostolic Vicar of Mitú–Puerto Inírida
 José Gustavo Angel Ramírez, M.X.Y. † (19 June 1989 – 30 Nov. 1996.11.30 see below), Titular Bishop of Vescera (1989.06.19 – death 2013.02.23)

Apostolic Vicars of Mitú
 José Gustavo Angel Ramírez, M.X.Y. † (see above 30 Nov. 1996.11.30 – retired 17 Sept. 2009)
Msgr. Damián Electo Chavarría Carvajal, M.X.Y., Pro-Vicar Apostolic of Mitú (Colombia) (2009 – 2013.11.23), no other prelature
 Medardo de Jesús Henao del Río, M.X.Y. (2013.11.23 – ...), Titular Bishop of Casæ Medianæ (2013.11.23 – ...)

See also 
 List of Roman Catholic dioceses in Colombia
 Roman Catholicism in Colombia

References

External links 
 GCatholic, with Google satellite photo

Apostolic vicariates
Roman Catholic dioceses in Colombia
Christian organizations established in 1949
1949 establishments in Colombia